Matthias Schömann-Finck (born 5 March 1979, in Bernkastel-Kues) is a former German lightweight rower.  In 2009 Schomann-Finck was part of the team of four that won the World Championship in the lightweight coxless four. The team included his brother, Jost. Both brothers became worldchampions again in 2012 in the lightweight eight. Matthias Schömann-Finck retired from international rowing in February 2016.

References 

1979 births
Living people
German male rowers
World Rowing Championships medalists for Germany